Aztlán (from) is the ancestral home of the Aztec peoples. Astekah is the Nahuatl word for "people from Aztlan". Aztlan is mentioned in several ethnohistorical sources dating from the colonial period, and while they each cite varying lists of the different tribal groups who participated in the migration from Aztlan to central Mexico, the Mexica who went on to found Mexico-Tenochtitlan are mentioned in all of the accounts.

Historians have speculated about the possible location of Aztlan and tend to place it either in northwestern Mexico or the Southwestern United States, although there are doubts about whether the place is purely mythical or represents a historical reality.

Legends
Nahuatl histories relate that seven tribes lived in Chicomoztoc, or "the place of the seven caves". Each cave represented a different Nahua group: the Xochimilca, Tlahuica, Acolhua, Tlaxcalteca, Tepaneca, Chalca, and Mexica. Along with these people, the Olmec-Xicalanca and Xaltocamecas are also said to come from Aztlan. Because of their common linguistic origin, those groups are called collectively "Nahualteca" (Nahua people). These tribes subsequently left the caves and settled "near" Aztlán.

The various descriptions of Aztlán apparently contradict each other. While some legends describe Aztlán as a paradise, the Codex Aubin says that the Aztecs were subject to a tyrannical elite called the Azteca Chicomoztoca. Guided by their priest, the Aztec tribe fled. On the road, their god Huitzilopochtli forbade them to call themselves Azteca, telling them that they should be known as Mexica.  Scholars of the 19th century—in particular Alexander von Humboldt and William H. Prescott—translated the word Azteca, as is shown in the Aubin Codex, to Aztec.

Some say that the southward migration began on May 24, 1064, CE, after the Crab Nebula events from May to July 1054. Each of the seven groups is credited with founding a different major city-state in Central Mexico.

A 2004 translation of the Anales de Tlatelolco gives the only known date related to the exit from Aztlan; day-sign "4 Cuauhtli" (Four Eagle) of the year "1 Tecpatl" (Knife) or 1064–1065, and correlated to January 4, 1065.

Cristobal del Castillo mentions in his book "Fragmentos de la Obra General Sobre Historia de los Mexicanos", that the lake around the Aztlan island was called Metztliapan or "Lake of the moon." Another version reads:One day a man heard a bird calling to him, saying, "Go now, go now." When the man told the chief about the bird, the chief was relieved. He had known his people must find a new land, their own land, but had waited for a sign. So the people gathered and began a long march. They followed an idol of Huitzilopochtli that the priests carried. As they went, Huitzilopochtli spoke through the priests and prepared the people for the greatness of their empire to come. He explained that they should travel until they came to a large lake; there, they should look for another sign—an eagle in a cactus.

The journey took 200 years, and the people settled for a while in the Toltec capital of Tollan. Some people stayed in Tollan and some moved on. From time to time, Huitzilopochtli changed himself into a white eagle to inspire the people, and they traveled until they came to Lake Texcoco and saw a great eagle sitting on a cactus, holding a serpent. There they built Tenochtitlán, the city that became the capital and center of the Aztec empire.

Places postulated as Aztlán

Friar Diego Durán (c. 1537–1588), who chronicled the history of the Aztecs, wrote of Aztec emperor Moctezuma I's attempt to recover the history of the Mexica by congregating warriors and wise men on an expedition to locate Aztlán. According to Durán, the expedition was successful in finding a place that offered characteristics unique to Aztlán. However, his accounts were written shortly after the conquest of Tenochtitlan and before an accurate mapping of the American continent was made; therefore, he was unable to provide a precise location.

During the 1960s, Mexican intellectuals began to seriously speculate about the possibility that Mexcaltitán de Uribe was the mythical city of Aztlán. One of the first to consider Aztlán being linked to the Nayaritian island was historian Alfredo Chavero towards the end of the 19th century. Historical investigators after his death tested his proposition and considered it valid, among them Wigberto Jiménez Moreno. This hypothesis is still up for debate.

Etymology
The meaning of the name Aztlan is uncertain. One suggested meaning is "place of Herons" or "place of egrets"—the explanation given in the Crónica Mexicáyotl—but this is not possible under Nahuatl morphology: "place of egrets" is Aztatlan.  Other proposed derivations include "place of whiteness" and "at the place in the vicinity of tools", sharing the āz- element of words such as teponāztli, "drum" (from tepontli, "log").

Use by the Chicano movement

The concept of Aztlán as the place of origin of the pre-Columbian Mexican civilization has become a symbol for various Mexican nationalist and indigenous movements.

In 1969 the notion of Aztlan was introduced by the poet Alurista (Alberto Baltazar Urista Heredia) at the National Chicano Youth Liberation Conference held in Denver, Colorado by the Crusade for Justice. There he read a poem, which has come to be known as the preamble to El Plan de Aztlan or as "El Plan Espiritual de Aztlan" due to its poetic aesthetic. For some Chicanos, Aztlan refers to the Mexican territories annexed by the United States as a result of the Mexican–American War of 1846–1848. Aztlán became a symbol for activists who believe they have a legal and primordial right to the land. In order to exercise this right, some members of the Chicano movement propose that a new nation be created, a República del Norte.

Aztlán is also the name of the Chicano studies journal published out of the UCLA Chicano Studies Research Center.

Movements that use or formerly used the concept of Aztlán
Brown Berets
MEChA (Movimiento Estudiantil Chicano de Aztlán, "Chicano Student Movement of Aztlán")
Plan Espiritual de Aztlán
Raza Unida Party
Freedom Road Socialist Organization, which calls for self-determination for the Chicano nation in Aztlan up to and including the right to secession.

In popular culture

In literature
"Aztlán"  has been used as the name of speculative fictional future states that emerge in the southwestern United States or Mexico after their governments suffer a collapse or major setback; examples appear in such works as the novels Heart of Aztlán (1976), by Rudolfo Anaya; Warday (1984), by Whitley Strieber and James Kunetka; The Peace War (1984), by Vernor Vinge; The House of the Scorpion (2002), by Nancy Farmer; and World War Z (2006), by Max Brooks; as well as the role-playing game Shadowrun, in which the Mexican government was usurped by the Aztechnology Corporation (1989). In Gary Jennings' novel Aztec (1980), the protagonist resides in Aztlán for a while, later facilitating contact between Aztlán and the Aztec Triple Alliance just before Hernán Cortés' arrival.

"Strange Rumblings in Aztlan" is an article written by Hunter S. Thompson that appeared in the April 29, 1971 issue of Rolling Stone. The article is about the death of civil rights activist Ruben Salazar in East Los Angeles during a Vietnam War protest.

See also

 List of mythological places

References

Bibliography

Further reading

External links
Sanderson, Susana, "Tenotchtitlan and Templo Mayor", California State University, Chico.
Aztlan Listserv (hosted by the Foundation for the Advancement of Mesoamerican Studies, Inc.)
League of Revolutionary Struggle, "The Struggle for Chicano Liberation" (an examination of Aztlan and the Chicano national movement from a Marxist point of view)
Los Angeles artist protesting walls in Berlin, Palestine and Aztlán

History of the Aztecs
Locations in Aztec mythology
Locations in Mesoamerican mythology
Mexican-American history
Separatism in North America